Levandoski is a surname. Notable people with the surname include:

Alana Levandoski, folk musician
Joe Levandoski (1921–2001), professional ice hockey player